Martina may refer to:

People 
 Martina (given name), a female form of Martin, including a list of people with the given name Martina
 Martina (surname), a surname found in Italy and Curaçao
 Martina (empress), the second Empress consort of the Byzantine Empire

Sport 
 A.S.D. Martina Calcio 1947, football club based in Martina Franca, Italy
 LCF Martina, a futsal club based in Martina Franca, Italy

Places 
 Martina Franca, a municipality in the province of Taranto, Italy
 Martina, Switzerland, a village in the Grisons

Other 
 Martina (album), a 2003 album by Martina McBride
 Martina (film), a 1949 West German drama film
 Martina (tunnel boring machine), a hard rock tunnel boring machine
 981 Martina, an asteroid
 La Martina, Argentine sportswear company and sponsor of international polo